Everland is South Korea's largest theme park. Located at the Everland Resort in Yongin, a city in  Gyeonggi-do, it receives 5.85 million visitors annually and was ranked 19th in the world for amusement park attendance in 2018. As of 2010, Everland is measured to be approximately 1,200,000 square yards. Along with its main attractions, Everland includes a zoo and water park known as Caribbean Bay. Everland is operated by Samsung C&T Corporation (formerly known as Samsung Everland, Cheil Industries), which is a subsidiary of the Samsung Group.

The park was formerly called "Jayeon Nongwon" which approximately translates to "natural farm." Its former English name was "Yongin Farmland."

History 

 1972: Planning of Yongin Forest Complex
 1974: Yongin Forest Complex was named Yongin Natural Farm
 1976: Opened under the name of Yongin Natural Farm (the largest theme park in Korea ever since).
 1985: Rose Festival Open
 1986: The tenth anniversary of its opening
 1993: Accumulated entry of 40 million people
 1996: In March, the existing name "Natural Farm", was renamed with the current name "Everland"
 1996: Joongang Development Company acquired Everland to begin renovations
 1996: Caribbean Bay Open in July
 2006: Everland Resort BI Change
 2006: The 30th anniversary of its opening
 2016: 40th anniversary, 20th anniversary of the opening of Caribbean Bay.

Themed areas
Everland is divided into five zones: Global Fair, Zoo-Topia, European Adventure, Magic Land and American Adventure.

Global Fair
Global Fair is primarily a place for food, souvenirs, and pictures as visitors enter and exit the park. There are shops and restaurants, also services such as rental stroller and lockers.

Zootopia
Zootopia is an animal-themed zone. There is a petting zoo, pony rides, and animal shows. There is a small zoo with a variety of animals including birds, polar bears, sea lions, penguins, bears, lions, tigers, and primates. A safari bus ride is also available, allowing watching some of the animals, such as ligers and bears, roaming in a contained habitat. The visitors stay on the bus. Amazon Express is a raft ride, where most visitors get splashed. The petting zoo contains animals such as goats and sheep to pet. Kosik, one of Zoo-Topia's elephants, made it to the headlines when he demonstrated an ability to imitate Korean words.

European Adventure
European Adventure has restaurants with European architectural styles. There is a flower garden encircled by a train, games and arcades. It includes the Mystery Mansion attraction, in which visitors can shoot at ghosts. In March 2008, a ride named "T Express" was added. It is the first roller-coaster in Korea to be constructed out of wood.

Magic Land
Magic Land encloses a display of buildings and rides. There is a section called Aesop's Village where the characters and themes  are primarily drawn from the fables of Aesop. The Ferris wheel provided views of the whole park until it closed in 2011 to allow for more rides. There is a log flume, a futuristic flying ride, and a robot ride. Along with the rides, there are restaurants and stands.

American Adventure
Themes from American history are presented in this portion of the park. There is one Western themed ride located in this section called ‘Rodeo’.

In Rock Ville, the theme is the 1950s and its music. The Double Rock Spin is a main attraction where live bands play near the Rolling X-Train, one of the roller coasters in the park.

Attractions

Roller Coasters

T Express

The T Express, which debuted in 2006, is the first wooden roller coaster and the largest in South Korea. The steepest point is the first drop, and the slope here is 77 degrees. Its name comes from the logo of conglomerate SK Corporation's SK Telecom service.

Jigu Maul (Global Village)
The Jigu Maul (which means "Global village") was established in August 1985 as the first dark boat ride in South Korea. It shows worldwide traditions, cultural customs, scenery with dolls and iconic miniatures from more than 18 countries, similar to the "It's a Small World" attraction at Disney Parks. However, due to safety reasons, it was torn down in 2016. Currently, there is a children's playground in the same location, called "Hide Away".

Characteristics of Jigu Maul
 Europe has dolls representing Netherlands, Germany, Austria, Italy, France, England, Spain and Sweden.
 The Arctic and North Pole feature dolls representing Scandinavia.
 America has dolls representing Brazil, Mexico and the United States with a miniaturized Golden Gate in San Francisco, Times Square and the Statue of Liberty in New York City.
 Africa has wild animals with natural forests and dolls representing Egypt, South Africa, Ethiopia, Uganda and Kenya's ethnic group of Maasai people.
 Asia has dolls representing India, China with a miniaturized Tiantan (Temple of Heaven) in Beijing, Japan with Matsuri folk-dancing, Korea with traditional percussion performance named Samulnori and fan dancing named Buchaechum at a miniaturized Namdaemun in Seoul.

Festival

Everland hosts the Tulip Festival from March to April each year. At the festival, visitors can enjoy various spring attractions such as Everland's customary photo spot 'magic tree', the streets that look like they have moved from the French flower market, and 'Aesop's umbrella street'. In addition, there are special performances for anyone, such as musicals and parades.

Attendance

Gallery

See also
 Lotte World
 Seoul Land
 Children's Grand Park

References

External links

Everland | Official Korea Tourism Organization 

Everland Resort
Buildings and structures in Yongin
Samsung subsidiaries
Parks in Gyeonggi Province
Amusement parks in South Korea
1976 establishments in South Korea
20th-century architecture in South Korea